Paradeudorix eleala, the western fairy playboy, is a butterfly in the family Lycaenidae. It is found in Guinea-Bissau, Guinea, Sierra Leone, Liberia, Ivory Coast, Ghana, Togo, Benin, Nigeria, Cameroon, Equatorial Guinea and the Democratic Republic of the Congo. The habitat consists of primary forests.

The larvae feed on Albizia zygia and Theobroma cacao. They are attended by the ant species Crematogaster buchneri.

Subspecies
Paradeudorix eleala eleala (eastern Nigeria, Cameroon, Bioko, Democratic Republic of the Congo: Mongala, Equateur, Kinshasa and Lualaba)
Paradeudorix eleala cufadana (Mendes & De Sousa, 2003) (Guinea-Bissau)
Paradeudorix eleala parallela (Collins & Larsen, 2000) (Guinea Bissau, Guinea)
Paradeudorix eleala viridis (Stempffer, 1964) (coast of Guinea, Sierra Leone, Liberia, Ivory Coast, Ghana, Togo, Benin, western Nigeria)

References

External links
Die Gross-Schmetterlinge der Erde 13: Die Afrikanischen Tagfalter. Plate XIII 66 a

Butterflies described in 1865
Deudorigini
Butterflies of Africa
Taxa named by William Chapman Hewitson